Oyomoi [অয়োময়] (The man who would not die) was a popular Bangladeshi television serial, written by Humayun Ahmed and directed by Nawazish Ali Khan, originally aired on Bangladesh Television in 1990–91. Blending fact with fiction it is set in the period of British Raj, the story centres on a declining Bangla Jomidar (landlord) family.

Cast
 Asaduzzaman Noor as Choto Mirza
 Abul Hayat
 Abul Khair
 Dilara Zaman
 Dr. Enamul Haque
 Saleh Ahmed 
 Sara Zaker as Elachi Begum
 Lucky Enam
 Bipasha Hayat
 Suborna Mustafa
 Afzal Sharif
 Mozammel Hossain
 KS Firoz
 Tarana Halim

References

https://www.thedailystar.net/showbiz/nawazish-ali-khan-50-years-television-1578325
https://www.thedailystar.net/arts-entertainment/news/reflections-abul-hayat-his-birthday-1957269
https://www.thedailystar.net/arts-entertainment/news/many-happy-returns-lucky-enam-1955861
https://www.thedailystar.net/arts-entertainment/tv/news/revisiting-bangladeshi-televisions-golden-era-1852786
http://m.theindependentbd.com/post/250405
https://en.prothomalo.com/bangladesh/humayun-ahmeds-death-anniversary-today
https://www.thedailystar.net/opinion/interviews/news/heart-heart-asaduzzaman-noor-1821397
https://www.dhakatribune.com/showtime/2019/10/30/asaduzzaman-noor-when-we-made-kothao-keu-nei-we-didn-t-realize-it-would-be-so-widely-accepted
https://www.dhakatribune.com/showtime/2017/11/12/humayuns-7-cluster-breaking-characters
https://www.thedailystar.net/the-stories-he-told-33755
https://www.newagebd.net/article/70702/actor-saleh-ahmed-passes-away
https://www.thedailystar.net/arts-entertainment/news/fond-remembrance-humayun-ahmed-his-7th-death-anniversary-1773433
https://www.thedailystar.net/arts-entertainment/event/asaduzzaman-noor-turns-70-1306768
https://www.newagebd.net/article/67364/lucky-enam-lifes-a-stage
http://www.newagebd.net/article/64822/sara-zaker-one-woman-many-roles
https://www.newagebd.net/article/57446/time-gives-shape-to-an-artiste-enamul-huq
https://www.newagebd.net/article/94733/celebs-who-passed-away
https://www.thedailystar.net/news/the-shakespeare-of-bangladesh
https://www.thedailystar.net/literature/remembrance-humayun-ahmed-171820
https://www.thedailystar.net/now-i-dont-hear-the-twittering-birds-dilara-zaman-45049
https://www.dhakatribune.com/bangladesh/parliament/2019/02/09/suborna-mustafa-named-among-al-candidates-for-women-s-reserved-seats
https://www.thedailystar.net/news-detail-47226
https://www.thedailystar.net/arts-entertainment/3rd-death-anniv-humayun-ahmed-observed-114004
https://www.thedailystar.net/showbiz/showbiz-column/television-lifetime/man-many-talents-82448
https://www.thedailystar.net/showbiz/cover-story/the-monologue-maestro-1265074
https://timesofindia.indiatimes.com/nri/citizen-journalists/citizen-journalists-reports/rashidul-bari/Tears-for-Humayun-Ahmed-The-Shakespeare-of-Bangladesh/articleshow/15515838.cms

1990s Bangladeshi drama television series
Bangladeshi drama television series
Bengali-language television programming in Bangladesh
Bangladesh Television original programming